The 1979 Benson & Hedges Championships, also known as the Wembley Championships, was a men's tennis tournament played on indoor carpet courts at the Wembley Arena in London, England that was part of the 1979 Colgate-Palmolive Grand Prix. It was the fourth edition of the tournament and was held from 13 November until 17 November 1979. First-seeded John McEnroe won his second consecutive title at the event.

Finals

Singles
 John McEnroe defeated  Harold Solomon 6–3, 6–4, 7–5
 It was McEnroe's 10th singles title of the year and the 15th of his career.

Doubles
 John McEnroe /  Peter Fleming defeated  Tomáš Šmíd /  Stan Smith 6–3, 6–2

References

External links
 ITF tournament edition details

Benson and Hedges Championships
Wembley Championships
Benson and Hedges Championships
Benson and Hedges Championships
Benson and Hedges Championships
Tennis in London